David Fredrick Gerlach (July 2, 1940–October 22, 2020) was a Canadian retired curler. He played as third on the Ron Northcott rink that won the 1969 Brier and World Championship. 

Gerlach was the son of Fritz and Ida Gerlach, and grew up in Stettler, Alberta area, and graduated high school from the Botha School in Botha, Alberta. 

Gerlach was a police officer with the Calgary Police Service when he won the Canadian Police Curling Championship in 1967, 1968, 1969, 1970 and 1972. Before becoming a police officer, Gerlach was a farmer in Stettler, Alberta. He returned to Stettler to farm in the 1970s, and worked as a car salesman. In 1981, he started a business selling pictures. 

Gerlach was married twice and had three daughters.

References

External links
 
 David Gerlach – Curling Canada Stats Archive
 Video:  (YouTube-channel "Curling Canada")

1940 births
2020 deaths
Brier champions
World curling champions
Canadian male curlers
Curlers from Calgary
Canadian police officers
Farmers from Alberta
People from the County of Stettler No. 6